The International School of Curaçao (ISC), located in Emmastad, Willemstad, Curaçao, is a private and coeducational day school.

References

“Fact Sheet for the International School of Curacao” US Department of State. Retrieved in September 2007
 Archives of the International School of Curaçao. Retrieved September 2007, from ISC Director.
 International School Services. Retrieved in December 2007
 American Overseas Schools Historical Society. Retrieved December 2007

External links 
 ISC Curriculum.
 Diploma Program at a glance

Buildings and structures in Willemstad
International Baccalaureate schools
American international schools in North America
American international schools in the Netherlands
Association of American Schools in South America